Miss Earth 2006, the 6th edition of the Miss Earth pageant, was held on November 26, 2006, at the grounds of the National Museum in Manila, Philippines. The pageant was won by Hil Hernández of Chile and crowned by outgoing titleholder, Miss Earth 2005, Alexandra Braun.

The event was originally intended to be held in Santiago, Chile on 15 November, and would be the first Miss Earth pageant outside of the Philippines and as well in Asia, but the Chilean organizers did not meet requirements. In the end, pageant owners Carousel Productions decided to hold the pageant in the Philippines, where all previous Miss Earth pageants had been held, despite having less than two months to prepare for the event.

More than 100 contestants were expected to compete, but only 82 eventually participated. Nevertheless, it was still the highest turn-out for the event.

On 24 November, a number of delegates participated in the Philippine version of Deal or No Deal, acting as suitcase models during the game. This followed an episode of the American game show, where 26 Miss USA 2006 contestants acted as suitcase models.

Results

Placements

Special awards

Order of announcements

Top 16

Top 8

Top 4

Winning answer
Final Question in Miss Earth 2006: "What effort must the country's government exert to stop global warming?"

Answer of Miss Earth 2006: "We have to educate the people on global warming. We should help them to control pollution, create global consciousness. Bigger industries are involved here. You run the economy, now it is your turn to take care of Mother Earth". – Hil Hernández, represented Chile.

Judges
The following is the list of the board of judges in this year's Miss Earth:

Preliminary events

Swimsuit
The delegates were divided into three groups which simultaneously competed in the swimsuit preliminary competition in three different locations: Trace Aquatic Sports Complex in Los Baños, Laguna, Golden Sunset Resort in Calatagan, Batangas and in Coron, Palawan. The competition was held on 12 November 2006.

The finalists from the Laguna group were: Jessica Anne Jordan (Bolivia), Francys Sudnicka (Poland), Patra Rungratansunthorn (Thailand), Amanda Pennekamp (USA), Marianne Puglia (Venezuela)

The finalists from the Batangas group were: Ana Quinot (Brazil), Riza Santos (Canada), Anne-Charlotte Triplet (France), Paloma Navarro (Paraguay), Richa Adhia (Tanzania)

Rounding off the top 15 finalists were the finalists who were selected from the third group in Coron, Palawan: Catherine Gregg (Guatemala), Catherine Untalan (Philippines), Cathy Daniel (Saint Lucia), Raimata Agnieray (Tahiti), Karina Kharchynska (Ukraine)

The 15 finalists then competed in the Final Swimsuit Competition, held on 18 November at the Fontana Leisure Park in Clark Field, Pampanga. From the 15 finalists, Marianne Puglia of Venezuela was awarded Best in Swimsuit.

Talent

The 2006 talent competition was held on 22 November at the Teatro Marikina, Marikina. 15 of the delegates, chosen in a preliminary competition days before, performed their talents in front of the judges and audience. The semi-finalists were Riza Raquel Santos (Canada), Zhou Mei Ting (China), Kristal Sprock (Curaçao), Nicoline Qvortrup (Denmark), Maria Stahl (Ecuador), Anne-Charlotte Triplet (France), Yelena Setiabudi (Indonesia), Sharon Amador (Nicaragua), Paloma Navarro (Paraguay), Catherine Untalan (Philippines), Nicoleta Motei (Romania), Raimata Agnieray (Tahiti), Tsering Chungtak  (Tibet), Nicquell Garland (Turks & Caicos) and Ha Anh Vu (Vietnam). The winner of the competition was Zhou Mei Ting of China. Ha Anh Vu was first runner-up.

Contestants
List of countries and delegates that participated in Miss Earth 2006:

  – Blerta Halili
  – Andrea Carolina Garcia
  – Natalie Newton
  – Leandra Pratt
  – Isabelle Cornelis
  – Jessica Jordan Burton
  – Bosena Jelcic
  – Kefilwe Kgosi
  – Ana Paula Quinot
  – Riza Santos
  – Stephanie Monique Espeut
  – Hil Hernández
  – Zhou Mengting
  – Maripaz Duarte
  – Kristal Rose Sprock
  – Petra Soukupová
  – Nicoline Qvortrup
  – Alondra Peña
  – Maria Magdalena Stahl
  – Meriam George
  – Ana Flor Astrid Machado
  – Holly Ikin
  – Dina Fekadu
  – Linnea Aaltonen
  – Anne Charlotte Triplet
  – Maria Sarchimelia
  – Fatima Funk
  – Mable Naadu Frye
  – Eugenia Lattou
  – Ingrid Bevis
  – Catherine Gregg
  – Helan Georges
  – Lesly Gabriela Molina Kristoffp
  – Amruta Patki
  – Yelena Setiabudi
  – Melanie Boreham
  – Maria Lucia Leo
  – Noriko Ohno
  – Emah Madegwa
  – Hee-jung Park
  – Nahed Al Saghir †
  – Rachel Njinimbam
  – Evelina Dedul
  – Ivana Popovska
  – Alice Loh
  – Megane Martinon
  – Alina Garcia
  – Ayushma Pokharel
  – Sabrina van der Donk
  – Annelise Burton
  – Sharon Amador
  – Ivy Obrori Edenkwo
  – Meria Leroy
  – Sehr Mahmood
  – Stefanie de Roux
  – Paloma Navarro
  – Valery Caroline Neff
  – Cathy Untalan
  – Francys Sudnicka
  – Camille Colazzo
  – Nicoleta Motei
  – Elena Salnikova
  – Cathy Daniel
  – Mililani Vienna Tofa
  – Dubravka Skoric
  – Shn Juay Shi Yun
  – Judita Hrubyová
  – Nancy Dos Reis
  – Rocio Cazallas
  – Cécilia Harbo Kristensen
  – Laura Ferrara
  – Raimata Agnieray
  – Chiu Yu-Cheng
  – Richa Maria Adhia
  – Pailin Rungratanasunthorn
  – Tsering Chungtak
  – Nicquell Garland
  – Karina Kharchinska
  – Amanda Pennekamp
  – Marianne Puglia
  – Vũ Nguyễn Hà Anh
  – Laura Livesy

Notes

Debuts

 
 
 
 
 
 
 
 
 
 
 

Notes: England and Wales are technically new as they were represented in the previous years as Great Britain or United Kingdom.

Returns

Last competed in 2001:
 
Last competed in 2002:
 
 
Last competed in 2004:

Withdrawals

Other notes
  – Riza Santos joined the Pinoy Big Brother Celebrity Edition 2 on 14 October 2007 and eventually won as first runner-up.
  – Nahed Al-Saghir died on 16 April 2011, of complications from a severe kidney infection.
  – Pailin Rungratanasunthor competed at Amazing Race Asia 3 alongside Miss Universe 2005 Natalie Glebova.

Images

References

External links

 
 Miss Earth Foundation
 Miss Earth Foundation Kids' I Love My Planet
 2006 Miss Earth Press Presentation Fan Page

2006
2006 in the Philippines
2006 beauty pageants
Beauty pageants in the Philippines